Novais may refer to:

People
Abílio Novais (born 1967), Portuguese football player and manager
João Novais (born 1993), Portuguese footballer
Paulo Dias de Novais (c.1510–1589), Portuguese explorer and colonial administrator
Walace de Sousa Novais (born 1993), Brazilian footballer
Nelson Novais (born 1988), Portuguese Engineer, and Mosano cofounder

Places
Novais, Brazil, São Paulo, Brazil
Novais, Portugal, a parish in the municipality of Vila Nova de Famalicão 

Disambiguation pages with surname-holder lists
Portuguese-language surnames